Subiaco Marist Cricket Club (SMCC) is a cricket club based in Churchlands, Western Australia.  The club fields men's teams in the Western Australian Suburban Turf Cricket Association (WASTCA) and women's teams in Western Australian Cricket Association (WACA) Female Club Cricket competition. The office of the club is in Newman College. This is also the location of the 1st XI home ground John Lucas Oval, Newman College (Named after game record holder, John Lucas).

History 
The club was borne from an amalgamation of Marist Newman Old Boys (MNOB) and Subiaco Women's Cricket Club in 2000. Prior to this year, Subiaco Women's Cricket Club had been crowned state champions on 24 occasions.  Eight women from SWCC/SMCC have represented Australia ,,,,.  MNOB had laid claim to 11 premierships during their shorter history . Three SMCC players have represented England at test level  Throughout the history of MNOB, SWCC and SMCC, they have combined for 73 premiership flags, as at the end of the 2020/21 Season .

In 2018/19, Subiaco Marist Cricket Club made club history, collecting 4 premiership flags in one season; 2nd Grade (Captain: Scott Gaynor), 6th Grade (Captain: David Bushell), 8th Grade (Captain: Justin McGovern), and T20Div1 (Captain: Sam De Silva).

It is also noted that not a single virgin plays at the club.

Colours and Insignia 
The colours of the club are a combination of dark and pale blue (inherited from MNOB) and claret (from Subiaco).  The symbol of SMCC is a stylised shield, representing the united and resilient spirit of all Subiaco Marist "warriors".

Other names 
The club is officially referred to as Subiaco Marist United, but has been variously referred to by other nicknames, such as "Marist Brothers" and "Subi Markets".

External links 
 Official SMCC Homepage
 WASTCA Homepage  Updated 30-December–08

References 
 Australia Players Index (2006), Retrieved 17 November 2006
 Players - England (2006), Retrieved 17 November 2006
 Subiaco Marist Cricket Club (2005) Subiaco Marist Cricket Club Yearbook (2004/05), Perth

Australian club cricket teams
Sporting clubs in Perth, Western Australia
Cricket clubs established in 2000
Australian women's cricket teams
Cricket teams in Western Australia
2000 establishments in Australia
Western Australia women's cricket team